Elisha Litchfield (July 12, 1785 Canterbury, Windham County, Connecticut – August 4, 1859 Cazenovia, Madison County, New York) was an American merchant and politician from New York.

Life
He attended the common schools, and learned the carpenter's trade. In November 1808, he married Percy Tiffany (d. 1827), and they had five children, among them Edwin Clark Litchfield (1815–1885). In 1812, he removed to Delphi. He fought in the War of 1812 and was promoted to Major. He was a Justice of the Peace and Supervisor of Onondaga County. He abandoned carpentry, and became a merchant. He was appointed Postmaster of Delphi on November 28, 1817, and served until June 25, 1821.

He was a member of  the New York State Assembly in 1819. Litchfield was elected as a Democratic-Republican to the 17th, and as a Crawford Democratic-Republican to the 18th United States Congress, holding office from December 3, 1821, to March 3, 1825. In 1828, he married Lucy Bacon, widow of Dr. Enos Bacon, and they had four children.

He was again a member of the State Assembly in 1831, 1832, 1833 and 1844, and was Speaker in 1844. Afterwards he removed to Cazenovia and died there on August 4, 1859. He was buried at the City Cemetery in Delphi Falls.

His son Edwin C. Litchfield ran for Congress as a Democrat in 1858 in the 2nd District, but was defeated by Republican James Humphrey.

References

Sources

The New England Historical and Genealogical Register published by the New England Historic Genealogical Society (1855; Vol. IX; pages 215f)
The Nominee of the Second Congressional District in NYT on October 6, 1858
EDWIN C. LITCHFIELD obit in NYT on July 23, 1885

1785 births
1859 deaths
People from Canterbury, Connecticut
Speakers of the New York State Assembly
People from Pompey, New York
New York (state) postmasters
American military personnel of the War of 1812
People from Cazenovia, New York
Democratic-Republican Party members of the United States House of Representatives from New York (state)
19th-century American politicians
American carpenters